The Mian Channu school house bombing occurred on 13 July 2009, when at least 12 people, including 8 children, died in the city of Mian Channu, Pakistan, after an explosion at a school.

Explosion
The blast happened in a school house used to teach Qur'an to children. The blast took place soon after a class was completed at about 9 am, while the students were leaving the house. Forty other houses were destroyed, and 60 people were injured. The house was owned by Riaz Ahmad Kamboh, a religious teacher. The blast left a crater 40 feet wide and 8 feet deep. After the blast, a steel box containing audio tapes of sermons by clerics belonging to Lashkar-e-Jhangvi was recovered from the house. It appeared that the house was also being used as an ammunition dump. According to local police, small rockets and missiles propelled by shoulder-fired launchers were among the other material recovered from the site.

Aftermath
Pakistani Prime Minister Yousaf Raza Gillani condemned the attack, and ordered an inquiry into the explosion. Subsequently, the police filed an FIR against three suspects, including Riaz, in connection with this explosion. It was reported that Riaz Kamboh was recruiting fighters for Tehrik-i-Taliban Pakistan, and was an expert at making suicide vests.

See also
Mian Channu
Punjab (Pakistan)
Pakistan

References

External links
Editorial: Terror’s free run in South Punjab, Daily Times (Pakistan)

21st-century mass murder in Pakistan
Khanewal District
Improvised explosive device bombings in Pakistan
School bombings
Mass murder in 2009
Terrorist incidents in Pakistan in 2009
School massacres in Pakistan
Murdered Pakistani children
Crime in Punjab, Pakistan
July 2009 events in Pakistan
Attacks on buildings and structures in Pakistan
Building bombings in Pakistan